The Honoris Crux Gold (Gold Cross of Honour), post-nominal letters HCG, is a South African military decoration for bravery which was instituted in 1975. It was awarded to members of the South African Defence Force for outstanding acts of bravery while in extreme danger. It was the second most senior in a set of four classes of Honoris Crux decorations which replaced the discontinued Honoris Crux of 1952.

The South African military
The Union Defence Forces (UDF) were established in 1912 and renamed the South African Defence Force (SADF) in 1958. On 27 April 1994 it was integrated with six other independent forces into the South African National Defence Force (SANDF).

Institution
The Honoris Crux Gold (Gold Cross of Honour), post-nominal letters HCG, was instituted by the State President on 1 July 1975.

Award criteria
The decoration could be awarded to members of the South African Defence Force for outstanding acts of bravery while in extreme danger. A Bar could be awarded for a further similar deed of bravery. It was the second most senior of a set of four classes of Honoris Crux decorations, the Honoris Crux Diamond, Honoris Crux Gold, Honoris Crux Silver and Honoris Crux, which together replaced the discontinued Honoris Crux of 1952.

Order of wear

The position of the Honoris Crux Gold in the official order of precedence was revised four times after 1975 to accommodate the inclusion or institution of new decorations and medals, first with the discontinuation of the Honoris Crux Diamond (HCD) on 3 September 1993, then upon the integration into the South African National Defence Force on 27 April 1994, again in April 1996 when decorations and medals were belatedly instituted for the two former non-statutory forces, the Azanian People's Liberation Army and Umkhonto we Sizwe, and finally with the institution of a new set of awards on 27 April 2003.

South African Defence Force until 3 September 1993
  
Official SADF order of precedence:
 Preceded by the Honoris Crux Diamond (HCD).
 Succeeded by the Star of South Africa, Gold (SSA).
Official national order of precedence:
 Preceded by the Honoris Crux Diamond (HCD).
 Succeeded by the Woltemade Decoration for Bravery, Gold.

South African Defence Force until 26 April 1994
  
Official SADF order of precedence, after the Honoris Crux Diamond (HCD) had been officially discontinued:
 Preceded by the Castle of Good Hope Decoration (CGH).
 Succeeded by the Star of South Africa, Gold (SSA).
Official national order of precedence:
 Preceded by the Castle of Good Hope Decoration (CGH).
 Succeeded by the Woltemade Decoration for Bravery, Gold.

South African National Defence Force from 27 April 1994
  
Official SANDF order of precedence, after the Castle of Good Hope Decoration (CGH) had been officially discontinued:
 Preceded by the Victoria Cross (VC) of the United Kingdom. 
 Succeeded by the Star of South Africa, Gold (SSA) of the Republic of South Africa.
Official national order of precedence:
 Preceded by the Victoria Cross (VC) of the United Kingdom. 
 Succeeded by the Woltemade Decoration for Bravery, Gold of the Republic of South Africa.

South African National Defence Force from April 1996
  
Official SANDF order of precedence:
 Preceded by the Victoria Cross (VC) of the United Kingdom. 
 Succeeded by the Gold Star for Bravery (GSB) of the Azanian People's Liberation Army.
Official national order of precedence:
 Preceded by the Victoria Cross (VC) of the United Kingdom. 
 Succeeded by the Woltemade Decoration for Bravery, Gold of the Republic of South Africa.

South African National Defence Force from 27 April 2003
  
Official SANDF order of precedence:
 Preceded by the Victoria Cross (VC) of the United Kingdom. 
 Succeeded by the Gold Star for Bravery (GSB) of the Azanian People's Liberation Army.
Official national order of precedence:
 Preceded by the Order of Mapungubwe, Platinum (OMP) of the Republic of South Africa.
 Succeeded by the Woltemade Decoration for Bravery, Gold of the Republic of South Africa.

Description
Obverse
The Honoris Crux Gold is a silver-gilt Maltese cross which fits in a circle 45 millimetres in diameter, with two swords in saltire surmounted by a circular protea wreath, the arms of the cross in green enamel, with a roundel in the centre tierced horizontally in the orange, white and blue bands of the national flag, framed in a double silver circle containing 24 stones. Apart from being silver-gilt instead of silver and having a more ornate ribbon suspender, it is identical to the Honoris Crux Silver in all respects.

Reverse
The reverse has the pre-1994 South African Coat of Arms, with the decoration number underneath.

Bar
The bar is of silver-gilt with a miniature replica of the Maltese cross embossed in the centre. Only one bar was ever made, after the Bar to the HCG was awarded to Captain Arthur Walker HCG. In lieu of the Bar, he was initially presented with a Clasp for 40 years of service to the Permanent Force Good Service Medal, also in silver-gilt, until one was eventually manufactured especially for him in 1991.

Ribbon
The ribbon is 32 millimetres wide and orange, with a single 1 millimetre wide white band in the centre.

Discontinuation
Conferment of the decoration was discontinued in 1992.

Recipients
Since inclusion in the table itself is impractical, the actions cited for follow below the table.

Actions cited for

References

Military decorations and medals of South Africa
Courage awards
1975 establishments in South Africa
Awards established in 1975